The list of ship commissionings in 1891 includes a chronological list of all ships commissioned in 1891.


See also 

1891
 Ship commissionings